"Hold Me for a While" is a pop ballad by the Swedish band Rednex, released from their second album Farm Out as the third and final single. It was the last single to feature the second female lead singer Whippy (Mia Löfgren), after she left the band in 2001, before she rejoined in 2015.

Track listing
 "Hold Me for a While" (Radio Edit) – 3:38
 "Hold Me for a While" (Alternative Radio Edit) – 3:40
 "Hold Me for a While" (Album Version) – 4:44
 "Hold Me for a While" (The Midnight Sun Remix) – 5:52

Charts

References

1998 songs
2000 singles
Rednex songs
Pop ballads
Zomba Group of Companies singles